The Warner T. Koiter Medal was established in 1996 by the American Society of Mechanical Engineers. It is awarded in recognition of distinguished work in the field of solid mechanics. 

The award was funded by the Technical University of Delft in the honor of Warner T. Koiter, who was a professor at the university from 1949 till 1979. Koiter's most influential work dealt with the non-linear stability of structures.

The recipient is given an honorarium and a bronze medal.

Nomination procedure
The Koiter Medal Committee consists of the five recent Koiter Medalists, the five members of the executive committee of the ASME International Applied Mechanics Division (AMD), and the five recent past chairs of the AMD.  Upon receiving recommendations from the international community of applied mechanics, the Committee nominates a single medalist every year.  This nomination is subsequently approved by the ASME Committee on Honors.

Koiter Medal recipients
 2021 – Gerhard A. Holzapfel, Graz University of Technology, Austria
 2020 – Anthony Waas, University of Michigan
 2019 – K. T. Ramesh, Johns Hopkins University
 2018 – M. Taher A. Saif, University of Illinois
 2017 – Wei Yang, Zhejiang University
 2016 – Pedro Ponte Castañeda, University of Pennsylvania
 2015 – Kaushik Bhattacharya, California Institute of Technology
 2014 – G. Ravichandran, California Institute of Technology
 2013 – Norman A. Fleck, Cambridge University
 2012 – Erik van der Giessen, Rijksuniversiteit Groningen
 2011 – James G. Simmonds
 2010 – Nicolas Triantafyllidis
 2009 – Stelios Kyriakides
 2008 – Richard. D. James, University of Minnesota
 2007 – Chin-Teh Sun
 2006 – Pierre Suquet
 2005 – Raymond W. Ogden
 2004 – Zenon Mróz
 2003 – David R. J. Owen
 2002 – James K. Knowles, California Institute of Technology
 2001 – Wolfgang G. Knauss, California Institute of Technology
 2000 – Giulio Maier
 1999 – Charles R. Steele
 1998 – Viggo Tvergaard
 1997 – Warner T. Koiter

References
Information for nomination
Koiter Medal page at the ASME website

See also

 List of mechanical engineering awards
Applied Mechanics Division
American Society of Mechanical Engineers
Applied mechanics
Mechanician

Mechanical engineering awards